Members of the New South Wales Legislative Council who served from 1889 to 1891 were appointed for life by the Governor on the advice of the Premier. This list includes members between the elections commencing on 1 February 1889 and the elections commencing on 17 June 1891. The President was Sir John Hay.

Although a loose party system had emerged in the Legislative Assembly at this time, there was no real party structure in the Council.

See also
Fifth Parkes ministry

Notes

References

 

Members of New South Wales parliaments by term
19th-century Australian politicians